Parwar may refer to:

Parwar, Pakistan, a town and union council in Balochistan province
Parwar (Jain community), a Jain community in Madhya Pradesh and Uttar Pradesh, India